Monstera egregia is a flowering plant belonging to genus Monstera of family Araceae.

Distribution 
It  is native from Central and S. Mexico to Belize.

References 

egregia
Flora of Mexico
Flora of Belize